Lynda Paige Marvel (born December 6, 1949) is an American lawyer who serves as a senior judge of the United States Tax Court.

Early life and education
Marvel was born in Maryland and graduated magna cum laude from the College of Notre Dame of Maryland (now the Notre Dame of Maryland University) in 1971. She earned her J.D. with honors from the University of Maryland School of Law in 1974, where she was awarded Order of the Coif, a member of the Maryland Law Review and of the Moot Court Board.

Judicial career

Tax Court
Marvel was appointed by President Bill Clinton as Judge, United States Tax Court, on April 6, 1998, for a term ending April 5, 2013. On April 6, 2013, Marvel took senior status. She was subsequently re-nominated to the position by President Barack Obama for an additional fifteen-year term on July 30, 2013. On January 15, 2014, Marvel testified before the Senate Finance Committee, "detailed her experiences during her first term as a Tax Court judge and said that if confirmed, she would continue to approach cases with an 'open mind and a commitment to justice.'" On February 4, 2014, the Senate Finance Committee "approved the nominations of Tamara W. Ashford and L. Paige Marvel to serve as U.S. Tax Court judges."  On November 20, 2014, the United States Senate confirmed her by voice vote to a second 15-year term. She assumed office for a second term on December 3, 2014.  She served as Chief Judge from June 1, 2016 to May 31, 2018. She took senior status on December 6, 2019.

Professional career
1988-1998: Partner, Venable, Baetjer & Howard L.L.P.
1986-1988: Shareholder, Melnicove, Kaufman, Weiner, Smouse & Garbis
1985-1986: Shareholder, Garbis, Marvel & Junghans
1976-1985: Shareholder, Garbis & Schwait
1974-1976: Associate, Garbis & Schwait

Awards and associations

Associations
1996-2003: Loyola/Notre Dame Library, Inc. Board of Trustees
1996-1998: Fellow and former Regent, American College of Tax Counsel
1996-1998: Board of Governors, Maryland State Bar Association
1995-2001: University of Maryland Law School Board of Visitors
1993-1995: Vice-Chair, ABA Section of Taxation, Committee Operations
1990-1998: Co-editor, Procedure Department, The Journal of Taxation
1989-1991: Member, Commissioner's Review Panel on IRS Integrity
1989-1992: ABA Council Director
1988-1990: Board of Governors, Maryland State Bar Association
1988-1998: Advisor, ALI Restatement of Law Third-The Law Governing Lawyers
1986–present: Advisory Committee, University of Baltimore Graduate Tax Program
1984-1990: Section Council, Federal Bar Association, Section of Taxation
1985-1987: Section Council, Federal Bar Association, Section of Taxation
1982-1983: Chair, Taxation Section
1981-1987: Member and Chair, Procedure Subcommittee, Commission to Revise the Annotated Code of Maryland (Tax Provisions)
1978-1981: Member, Advisory Commission to the Maryland State Department of Economic and Community Development

Awards
2002: 1st Annual Tax Excellence Award, Maryland State Bar Assn. Tax Section
1998: Maryland's Top 100 Women for 1998
1995: ABA Tax Section's Distinguished Service Award
1991-1998: Best Lawyers in America
1982-1983: MSBA Distinguished Service Award

References

|-

1949 births
Living people
Judges of the United States Tax Court
Notre Dame of Maryland University alumni
United States Article I federal judges appointed by Bill Clinton
University of Maryland, Baltimore alumni
20th-century American judges
21st-century American judges
20th-century American women judges
21st-century American women judges
United States Article I federal judges appointed by Barack Obama